60ml: Last Order is a 2014 Malayalam short film about alcoholism, written and directed by Krishna Murali. This movie was published on YouTube in June 2014.

Plot
The film begins with a quote from F. Scott Fitzgerald.  It revolves around Thomas (Larish), a man whose alcoholism eventually destroys his life.  15 years ago, he was introduced to alcohol by his friends for getting a girlfriend.  In college, he skips class to go drinking.  After he graduates, he refuses to find a job, choosing to keep drinking instead.  When his girlfriend breaks up with him, he begins to drink even more, eventually finding that he has forgotten and lost all the skills and talent he once possessed.  The film ends with Larish aimlessly slumped over a table.

Production

Filming
60ml: Last Order was shot entirely on a Nokia Lumia.

Location
A major portion of this film was shot in Trivandrum.

Social awareness
An article about this film, entitled "An Alcoholic's Diary", was published in the New Indian Express, as well as in Keralan online media, such as "Ente City" and "One India Mayalam".

See also
The Art Cafe

References

An Article about the film in Ente City
Article about this film in The New Indian Express
Article about the film in One India Malayalm

External links

A Post about the film in Reel Heart Media's Facebook Page

2014 films
Films shot in Thiruvananthapuram
2010s Malayalam-language films
Mobile phone films